Jesse Jones was born on November 13, 1936, in Big Sandy, Texas. He died on July 14, 2014. He was the son of Hattie Chalk and Truman Jones.

Military
Jones was a former member of the United States Marine Corps. He served from 1952 to 1973, having served in the Korean and Vietnam Wars.  He earned two Purple Hearts during his tenure.

Judo
Jones learned Judo while a member of the US Marines.  He went on to teach Judo for over 55 years.  During this time, he implemented a number of Judo programs in the San Diego Area as well as Southwestern College. He organized a number of tournaments at Southwestern College.  Jones served as the Southwest Judo Association Yudankashi's first vice president. Jones was also a President of the United States Judo Association.   It was during this tenure that he brought the organization back from almost closing due to bankruptcy.  He won the United States Judo Association's Coach of the Year Award in 2013.  He served as a technical advisor during the US Olympics in Los Angeles in 1984 and Atlanta in 1996.  Jones also earned the United States Judo Associations USJA Lifetime Achievement Award.

Personal life
Jones married Joan Seidel and had two children, Andrea Lee and Nicole Suzanne.
Jones earned his MBA from San Diego State.

References

1936 births
2014 deaths
United States Marines
American male judoka
Martial arts school founders
Judoka trainers
People from Big Sandy, Texas
Military personnel from Texas
San Diego State University alumni
20th-century philanthropists